Arnie is a masculine given name, frequently a shortened version of Arnold. It may refer to:

People
 Arnie Arenz (1911–1985), American National Football League quarterback in 1934
 Arnie Beyeler (born 1964), American minor league baseball player and manager and Major League Baseball coach and instructor
 Arnie Brown (born 1942), Canadian National Hockey League player
 Arnie Ferrin, Jr. (1925–2022), American National Basketball Association player
 Arnie Fisher (born 1938), American professional bridge player, bridge author
 Arnold Galiffa (1927–1978), American National Football League and Canadian Football League quarterback
 Arnie David Giralt (born 1984), Cuban triple jumper
 Arnie Hamilton, Canadian politician
 Arnie Herber (1910–1969), American Hall-of-Fame National Football League quarterback
 Arnold Horween (1898–1985), American college and National Football League player and coach
 Arnie Johnson (1920–2000), American National Basketball Association player
 Arnie Kogen, American comedy writer
 Arnie Kullman (1927–1999), Canadian hockey player
 Arnie Lawrence (1938–2005), American jazz saxophonist
 Arnie Lerma (born 1950), American writer and activist, former Scientologist and critic of Scientology
 Arnie McWatters, Canadian Football League quarterback in the 1930s and '40s
 Arnie Morrison (born 1909), Canadian Football League player in the 1930s
 Arnie Morton (1922–2005), American restaurateur who founded Morton's Restaurant Group/Morton's Steakhouse
 Arnie Oliver (1907–1993), American Soccer League player, member of the National Soccer Hall of Fame
 Arnold Palmer (1929–2016), American Hall-of-Fame golfer
 Arnie Patterson (1928–2011), Canadian journalist, public relations professional and broadcaster
 Arnie Portocarrero (1931–1986), American Major League Baseball pitcher
 Arnie Risen (1924–2012), American Hall-of-Fame college basketball and National Basketball Association player
 Arnie Robinson, Jr. (1948–2020), American long jumper, 1976 Olympic champion
 Arnie Roblan (born 1948), American politician
 Arnie Roth, American Grammy Award-winning conductor, composer and record producer
 Arnold Schwarzenegger (born 1947), Austrian-American actor, former professional bodybuilder and politician
 Arnie Shockley (1903–1988), American National Football League player
 Arnie Sidebottom (born 1954), English footballer and cricketer
 Arnie Simkus (born 1943), American National Football League player
 Arnie Sowell (born 1935), American middle distance runner
 Arnie States, a radio host on The Rob, Arnie, and Dawn Show
 Arnie Stone (1892–1948), American Major League Baseball pitcher
 Arnie Stuthman (born 1941), American politician
 Arnie Tuadles (1956–1996), Philippine Basketball Association player
 Arnie Weinmeister (1923–2000), Canadian Hall-of-Fame National Football League player
 Arnie Zane (1948–1988), American photographer, choreographer and dancer
 Arnold Zimmerman (born 1954), American ceramic artist

Fictional characters
 Arnold "Arnie" Cunningham, protagonist of the novel Christine by Stephen King
 Arnie Nuvo, title character of the TV sitcom Arnie (1970–1972)
 The player character in Arnie and Arnie II, video games for the Commodore 64

See also
 Arne (disambiguation)
 Arney (disambiguation)
 Arnee and the Terminaters, a one-hit wonder band that parodied Schwarzenegger and the "Terminator" character
 Arnaud (disambiguation)
 Arnold (disambiguation)
 Arny (disambiguation) 

English-language masculine given names
Hypocorisms
Masculine given names
English masculine given names